Protein Wisdom is a libertarian weblog created by former academic and sometime fiction writer Jeff Goldstein—a self-described classical liberal.

Background
Goldstein's respect for the legacy of Hunter S. Thompson is an enduring theme, as is his sardonic allusions to such popular cult figures as Martha Stewart and the fictional Billy Jack. The blog is known for its bawdy overtones, surrealistic sense of humor, and biting wit. Ronald Reagan and Barry Goldwater are also held in high esteem.

Controversies
Goldstein vocally opposed the abrupt change of financial arrangements by Pajamas Media in 2009, which deprived him — and other bloggers such as The Anchoress and Ace of Spades HQ — of income from PJM-mediated advertising.  He also publicly chastised those he refers to as GOP pragmatists or realists for their criticism of Rush Limbaugh's answer to a question about the coming Obama presidency, once again relying on linguistics and hermeneutics to make the point that "losing more slowly" is still losing, and that there is nothing more pragmatic, as a political strategy, than standing on principle

Deborah Frisch incident
On July 4, 2006, University of Arizona adjunct professor Deborah Frisch started writing comments at Protein Wisdom.  Two days later, she wrote "You live in Colorado, I see. Hope no one JonBenets your baby." She then added: "I reiterate: If some nutcase kidnapped your child tomorrow and did to him what was done to your fellow Coloradan, JonBenet Ramsey, I wouldn't give a damn."
She later resigned and apologized,
saying "I don’t think professors should do that. I crossed the line."
Her behavior gained nationwide news coverage.
Following further incidents, Goldstein obtained a restraining order and preliminary injunction against her. Goldstein has said he took temporary breaks from blogging to deal with continued harassment from Frisch, who has faced continued legal problems since her relocation to the Pacific Northwest. Conservative bloggers have alleged cyberstalking and other strange behavior by Frisch since then.
In 2015, Frisch was arrested four times on charges including stalking, menacing, criminal trespass, and initiating a false police report.  During the controversy, Protein Wisdom underwent repeated denial-of-service attacks.

References

External links
 
 Jeff Goldstein Biography

American political blogs
Mass media in Colorado
Libertarian publications